Ola Kristiansson (born 23 September 1971) is a former professional tennis player from Sweden.

Biography
A right-handed player from Helsingborg, Kristiansson was a Sweden Junior Davis Cup team representative and made three grand slam boys' doubles quarter-finals in 1989, with Nicklas Kulti.

Kristiansson, who turned professional in 1990, was most prominent on tour as a doubles player, with a best ranking of 123 in the world. In singles he had a career high ranking of 277 and reached the final round of qualifying in each of the four grand slam tournaments during his career. He won his only singles match on the ATP Tour at the Prague Open in 1994, over Bohdan Ulihrach.

In 1995 he competed in the main draw of the men's doubles at all grand slam events. At the Australian Open he made the round of 16 partnering Lars-Anders Wahlgren, which included a win against sixth seeds David Adams and Andrei Olhovskiy. He also paired up with Wahlgren for first round exits at the French Open and Wimbledon. With a new partner, Mårten Renström, Kristiansson reached the round of 16 at the US Open.

Since retiring in 1997 he has been a tennis coach. Previously the personal coach of Sofia Arvidsson and Johanna Larsson, he now coaches locally in Båstad.

Challenger titles

Doubles: (3)

References

External links
 
 

1971 births
Living people
Swedish male tennis players
Swedish tennis coaches
Sportspeople from Helsingborg